Kráľová nad Váhom is a village and municipality in Šaľa District, in the Nitra Region of southwest Slovakia.

Geography
The village lies at an altitude of 121 metres and covers an area of 9.509 km².

History
In historical records the village was first mentioned in 1113.
After the Austro-Hungarian army disintegrated in November 1918, Czechoslovak troops occupied the area, later acknowledged internationally by the Treaty of Trianon. Between 1938 and 1945 Kráľová nad Váhom once more  became part of Miklós Horthy's Hungary through the First Vienna Award. From 1945 until the Velvet Divorce, it was part of Czechoslovakia. Since then it has been part of Slovakia.

Population
According to the 2011 census, the municipality had 1,691 inhabitants. 1,149 of inhabitants were Hungarians, 485 Slovaks and 55 others and unspecified.

Facilities
The village has a public library, a DVD rental store a gym and a football pitch.

References

External links
https://web.archive.org/web/20080111223415/http://www.statistics.sk/mosmis/eng/run.html 

Villages and municipalities in Šaľa District
Hungarian communities in Slovakia